Aleš Besta (born 10 April 1983 in Ostrava) is a Czech former football player.

Besta played for Czech youth national football teams from the under-15 level and played at the 2003 FIFA World Youth Championship in the United Arab Emirates.

External links 
 Slavia Profile
 Profile at ČMFS website
 FIFA Profile
 90minut.pl profile

1983 births
Living people
Czech footballers
Czech Republic youth international footballers
Czech Republic under-21 international footballers
Czech expatriate footballers
SK Slavia Prague players
FC Zbrojovka Brno players
MŠK Žilina players
FC Baník Ostrava players
Górnik Zabrze players
Czech First League players
Slovak Super Liga players
Expatriate footballers in Slovakia
Expatriate footballers in Poland
Sportspeople from Ostrava
Czech expatriate sportspeople in Slovakia
Czech expatriate sportspeople in Poland
Association football forwards
MŠK Púchov players
FC Fastav Zlín players
MFK Karviná players